The Rose Hall of Fame contains roses considered world favourites by a vote of members of the World Federation of Rose Societies. Inductees are announced every three years at World Rose Conventions. Additionally, popular historical roses and roses of genealogical importance are inducted in the Old Rose Hall of Fame.

List of Hall of Fame roses

List of Hall of Fame old roses

See also

ADR rose
List of Award of Garden Merit roses
 All-America Rose Selections

References

External links

Lists of cultivars
Plant awards
 
Halls of fame in England